The Historical Society of Michigan (HSM) is the official historical society of the State of Michigan. It was founded in 1828 by Territorial Governor Lewis Cass.

References 

Michigan
1828 establishments in Michigan Territory
Historical societies in Michigan